Asimoneura pantomelas is a species of tephritid or fruit flies in the genus Trypeta of the family Tephritidae.

Distribution
Tanzania, Zimbabwe, South Africa.

References

Tephritinae
Insects described in 1926
Diptera of Africa